Dalcha, is an Indian lentil-based stew originating from Hyderabad, Telangana, India. Its origins may lie with a similar middle eastern dish Harees which is more of a gruel with cooked meats. Primary ingredients are lentils, can be Chana Dal or sometimes Tur dal. Vegetables or meats, both chicken or mutton may also be added to the stew, so if mutton is added it will be called a mutton dalcha. Bottle gourd is another key ingredient in a Dalcha. It is traditionally served with the rice dish called bagara khana.

History
Despite being Indian origin, Dalcha has been considered a must-have at most Malay weddings in Malaysia and Singapore.

See also 

 List of lamb dishes

References

External links
 Recipe on Tripod
 Authentic Mutton Dalcha

Hyderabadi cuisine
Indian curries
Lamb dishes
Legume dishes